The Recoil is a 1917 silent drama film directed by George Fitzmaurice and starring William Courtenay. It was released through the Pathé Exchange company. It was filmed on the East Coast at Jersey City, New Jersey.

An incomplete print survives in the Library of Congress collection. Reel 1 is missing. Prints and/or fragments were found in the Dawson Film Find in 1978.

Cast
William Courtenay - Richard Cameron
Lilian Greuze - Marian Somerset
Frank Belcher - Charles Van Horn
Dora Mills Adams - Mrs. Somerset
William Raymond - Page Somerset

References

External links

1917 films
American silent feature films
Films directed by George Fitzmaurice
1917 drama films
Silent American drama films
American black-and-white films
Films shot in Fort Lee, New Jersey
Pathé Exchange films
1910s American films